_
Fusion Magazine is an LGBTQ focused student run magazine at Kent State University. It was started in the fall of 2002 by founding editors Mandy Jenkins, Marie Cornuelle, and advisor Kate Common, eventually becoming a permanent part of student media.

Since then, the magazine has won several awards and continues to expand its audience base. Published twice a year by KSU students, Fusion addresses sexuality issues using in-depth feature articles and photo essays. Past stories tackled political trends, religion and sexuality, domestic partner benefits, LGBT athletes in the NCAA, anti-discrimination policies, parents coming out to spouses and children, gay adoption, AIDS support groups, physical and mental health issues, social change and more.

Its national advertisers have included the popular lesbian magazine, Curve, as well as Pride & Equality Magazine. The magazine received recognition from the Society of Professional Journalists, including First Place for the Best Student Magazine published more than once a year in print and also First Place for Best All-Around Online Student Magazine.

The combined efforts of student media advisor Kate Common and award winning ''The Burr Magazine' editor-in-chief Mandy Jenkins interviewing Kent State University President Carol Cartwright  resulted in Fusion Magazine eventually gaining a permanent office in Kent State University's Student Media and Professional School of Journalism.

The magazine received a $2,000 grant from the Gay Community Endowment Fund of Akron Community Foundation in December 2006.

Awards

2003
Society of Professional Journalists Mark of Excellence Awards:
 First Place: Photo Illustration, Scott Galvin, "Fighting homophobia on the field"
 Second Place: Best All-Around Online Student Magazine, Staff 
 Third Place: Feature Photography, Pat Jarrett, "My (Gay) Fraternity Life"
 Honorable Mention: Best Student Magazine (published once a year), Staff

2004
Society of Professional Journalists Mark of Excellence Awards:
 First Place: Best Student Magazine (Published More Than Once a Year), Staff
 First Place: Best All-Around Online Student Magazine, Staff

2006
Society of Professional Journalists Mark of Excellence Awards:
 First Place: Best Student Magazine, Staff
 Third Place: Best Affiliated Web site, Staff

2013
Association for Education in Journalism and Mass Communication Magazine Division Awards:
 Third Place: Design, Staff

2015
Association for Education in Journalism and Mass Communication Magazine Division Awards:
 Honorable Mention: People, “All About Andrew", Dana Woods 
 Third Place: Single Issue of an Ongoing Magazine, Brittany Rees, Editor

2018
Association for Education in Journalism and Mass Communication Magazine Division Awards:
 First Place: General Excellence, Staff

2022
Fusion's staff was recognized in 2022 by the Society of Professional Journalists Mark of Excellence (MOE) Awards Region 4 as "Best Student Magazine."

References

External links
Official site
Fusion Archive Online
 Fusion Magazines award winning 2021 "Intersectionality" edition

2003 establishments in Ohio
Student magazines published in the United States
LGBT-related magazines published in the United States
Magazines established in 2003
Magazines published in Ohio